In naval architecture an afterdeck or after deck, or sometimes the aftdeck, aft deck or a-deck, is the open deck area toward the stern or aft back part of a ship or  boat. The afterdeck can be used for a number of different purposes. Not all ships have an afterdeck. In place of the afterdeck a ship may be built with a poop deck, that is a deck that forms the roof of a cabin built in the rear, or "aft", part of the superstructure of a ship. A poop deck usually is higher up than an afterdeck.  A ship may have its superstructure or aftercastle located in the stern and thus not have an afterdeck. The stern and afterdeck of a ship are usually more smooth and stable than the bow (front) of the ship in motion.
A taffrail is the handrail around the open afterdeck or poop deck. On wooden sailing ships like  man-of-war or East Indiaman the taffrail is usually a hand carved wood rail and often highly decorated.

Afterdeck uses
 Navy war ships may use the afterdeck to mount deck guns.
 Missile boats may have missiles launching on the afterdeck.
 Minelaying gear on Navy ship's afterdeck.
 Minesweeper gear on Navy ship's afterdeck.
 Depth charge launching on Navy ship's afterdeck.
 Torpedo tube for torpedo launching on Navy ship's afterdeck.
 Some Navy and private ships use the afterdeck as a helicopter deck for a heliport for helicopters.
 A sundeck for chairs, chaise longue and lounge chairs.
 Rear deck swimming pool with a sundeck.
 On fishing boats a place to lay fishing nets or big-game fishing chairs or trawler gear.
 Cable laying gear.
 Scuba diving deck.
 Amphibious vehicle launching
 Submersible launching
 Water skiing launching
 Samson post, a strong pillar-post for a towing cable or other support.
 Lifting crane or gantry crane.
 Ferry ramp for vehicles.
 Ancient Greece ships sometimes had shrines or altars on the afterdeck.

Gallery

See also
Common names for decks
Main deck

References

Sailing ship components
Shipbuilding
Nautical terminology